Mohan Jiwa (born 26 April 1981) is a Malaysian field hockey player. He competed in the men's tournament at the 2000 Summer Olympics.

References

External links
 

1981 births
Living people
Malaysian people of Tamil descent
Malaysian sportspeople of Indian descent
Malaysian male field hockey players
Olympic field hockey players of Malaysia
Field hockey players at the 2000 Summer Olympics
Place of birth missing (living people)
Commonwealth Games medallists in field hockey
Commonwealth Games bronze medallists for Malaysia
Field hockey players at the 2006 Commonwealth Games
2002 Men's Hockey World Cup players
Medallists at the 2006 Commonwealth Games